The Stalking of Laurie Show (also known by the title Rivals outside of the United States) is a 2000 made-for-TV movie that was directed by Norma Bailey. The movie is based on the true-life murder of Lancaster native Laurie Show.

Plot
Laurie Show was a naive and trusting sixteen year old girl (Jennifer Finnigan), that became entangled in the lives of Lisa Michelle Lambert (Marne Patterson) and her boyfriend Lawrence Yunkin. Laurie was initially befriended by Michelle, who later turned on her after Laurie was raped by Lawrence. Believing that Laurie was lying about the rape and that she had pursued Lawrence, Michelle began harassing and stalking Laurie, often with the assistance of friends. This harassment culminated in Michelle murdering Laurie in her home with the help of her friend Tabitha Buck. Laurie's mother discovered the body and Michelle, Lawrence, and Tabitha were quickly arrested. Lawrence pleaded guilty and testified against the other two girls in exchange for a reduced sentence, with Michelle and Tabitha receiving life sentences without parole.

Cast
 Mary-Margaret Humes as Hazel Show
 Jennifer Finnigan as Laurie Show
 Marnette Patterson as Michelle Lambert
 Rel Hunt as Butch Yunkin
 Jessica Greco as Samantha Gardner
 Joanne Vannicola as Tabitha Buck
 Richard Fitzpatrick as Uncle Jake
 Sandra Caldwell as Mary Rudolph
 Don Dickinson as Pete Webster
 Polly Shannon as Christine
 Dominic Zamprogna as Andrew
 Karyn Dwyer as Jennifer
 Courtney Hawkrigg as Paula
 Jeff Berg as Danny Gardner

Reception
Critical reception for the film was predominantly negative, with both Variety and People panning the film. The Sun-Sentinel criticized the film as "pointlessly violent" and stated that "[t]he only people who should be more ashamed of it than USA and Raphael -- who obviously won't be -- are those who encourage more such trash by watching".

The Stalking of Laurie Show was also criticized for "[distorting] the truth", with an article in the Lubbock Avalanche-Journal stating that Lambert was not the "90210-style prom queen" nor Show the outcast that they were portrayed as in the film. The reporter went on to argue that the changes to the film, along with the sexual content "designed only to titillate", was largely unnecessary and detracted from the crime itself.

References

External links
 

2000 television films
2000 films
Canadian drama television films
Crime films based on actual events
English-language Canadian films
Films about stalking
Films directed by Norma Bailey
Lifetime (TV network) films
Canadian thriller television films
2000s Canadian films